Por El Pasado ('For The Past') is a studio album released by Grupo Bryndis. All tracks were composed by the band members.

Track listing

Porque Me Enamore 3:38 (Guadalupe Guevara) 
Mi Preciosa Mujer 4:10 (Juan Guevara) 
Tu Adiós 3:21 (Mauro Posadas) 
Corazón Vacio 3:46 (Gerardo Izaguirre) 
Pagando Mi Pasado 3:52 (Mauro Posadas) 
De Que Sirvio 3:40 (Juan Guevara) 
Odio, Tencor y Celos 4:26 (Mauro Posadas) 
El Amor de Mi Vida 3:16 (Claudio Pablo Montano) 
Dónde Estás? 4:07 (Guadalupe Guevara) 
Una Aventura Más 3:29 (Juan Guevara)

Sales and certifications

References

Grupo Bryndis albums
2000 albums
Disa Records albums